Dzolo (also Ave-Dzolo) is a village with 4,000 residents near the town of Kévé in southwest Togo.

Exonomy
The primary economic activity in the village is agriculture; its principal crops are peanuts, corn, pineapple, and manioc. It used to be twinned with Saint-Jean-de-Maurienne, France.

References

Populated places in Maritime Region